Tännäs is a village and parish in Härjedalen, Sweden. In 2015, it had a population of 140.

Tännäs Church (Tännäs kyrka) was built between 1840 and 1851, underwent renovation in 1855 and was inaugurated on October 10, 1858. The drawings were made by architect Johan Adolf Hawerman (1812–1885) and construction was led by builder Johan Nordell. In 1984, a thorough renovation was carried out wherein the original colors were produced. These had been painted over 1958.

References

External links

Populated places in Härjedalen Municipality
Härjedalen
Diocese of Härnösand